Quiet Days is a studio album by Battlefield Band released in 1992 on the Temple Records label.

Reception

Track listing
 "Captain Lachlan MacPhail of Tiree/Peter MacKinnon of Skeabost/The Blackberry Bush" – 3:23
 "The River" – 4:37
 "Dalnabreac/The Bishop's Son/Miss Sharon McCusker" – 3:50
 "From Here to There/Jack Broke the Prison Door/Toss The Feathers/The Easy Club Reel" – 4:05
 "The St. Louis Stagger/The Ass in the Graveyard/Sandy's New Chanter" – 4:20
 "Captain Campbell/Stranger at the Gate/John Keith Laing" – 3:04
 "Hold Back the Tide" – 3:37
 "BLISTERED FINGERS: The Cumbernauld Perennials/The Keep Left Sign/Taking The Soup/Bonnie George Campbell/Mo Dhachaidh/The Loch Ness Monster" – 8:45
 "Curstaidh's Farewell" – 4:13
 "The Hoodie Craw" – 3:35
 "Col. MacLean of Ardgour/Pipe Major Jimmy MacGregor/Rocking The Baby" – 4:30
 "How Will I Ever Be Simple Again?/Dawn Song" – 3:38

Sources and links

References 

Battlefield Band albums
1992 albums